Prestwichia is a wasp genus in the family Trichogrammatidae. It contains seven species.

References 

Trichogrammatidae
Taxa named by John Lubbock, 1st Baron Avebury